Marilyn Bernie "Tena" Gresky Campbell (born December 11, 1944) is an American jurist, lawyer, and former school teacher. She is a senior United States district judge of the United States District Court for the District of Utah.

Education and career

Born in Wendell, Idaho, Campbell received a Bachelor of Arts degree from the University of Idaho in 1967, a Master of Arts from Arizona State University in 1970, and a Juris Doctor from Arizona State University College of Law in 1977.

She began her career as a school teacher. She taught French at a high school level in Twin Falls, Idaho from 1967 to 1969 and taught the same subject at Tempe High School in Tempe, Arizona from 1972 to 1973. She taught French in evening classes at Phoenix Junior College in Phoenix, Arizona from 1972 to 1973.

She was in private practice in Salt Lake City, Utah from 1977 to 1981, and then entered public service, becoming a Deputy county attorney in the Salt Lake County Attorney's Office, Utah in 1981. Later that year, she became an Assistant United States Attorney in Salt Lake City, a position she held until 1995.

Federal judicial service

On June 22, 1995, Campbell was nominated by President Bill Clinton to a seat on the United States District Court for the District of Utah vacated by Bruce Sterling Jenkins. She was confirmed by the United States Senate on June 30, 1995, and received her commission the same day. She served as chief judge from 2006 to 2011. She assumed senior status on January 1, 2011.

Honor

She was named the Christine M. Durham Woman Lawyer of the Year in 2007 by Woman Lawyers of Utah.

See also
 List of first women lawyers and judges in Utah

References

External links
 
 District court web page for Judge Campbell

1944 births
Living people
Arizona State University alumni
Assistant United States Attorneys
Judges of the United States District Court for the District of Utah
People from Wendell, Idaho
Sandra Day O'Connor College of Law alumni
United States district court judges appointed by Bill Clinton
University of Idaho alumni
20th-century American judges
21st-century American judges
20th-century American women judges
21st-century American women judges